The Courier de l'Égypte (the Courier of Egypt) was a newspaper used for propaganda purposes during the Napoleonic invasion of Egypt, focusing on the matters of "war, travel stories of many correspondents wandering around Cairo on the lookout for a picturesque scene".

History
Its first issue was published on 29 August 1798, edited by Joseph Fourier, one of the savants (scientists, engineers, artists and botanists) brought along by Napoleon for the expedition. Many of these savants made up the Institut d'Egypte (Institute of Egypt), from which most of the contributions to the Courier de l'Égypte were made. The paper had a four-page and two-column format and was published irregularly.

The last issue of Courier de l'Égypte was published on 9 June 1801, just two and a half months before the end of the campaign. During its lifetime Courier de l'Égypte produced a total of 116 issues.

Notes

References

See also
Journal de Malte, a similar publication in French-occupied Malta

External links
Courier de l'Egypte – full archive of the newspaper at Gallica, the digital library of the National Library of France

Defunct newspapers published in Egypt
French-language newspapers published in Egypt
Publications established in 1798
Publications disestablished in 1801
Newspapers of the French Revolution
Propaganda newspapers and magazines
History of printing